Titus Nicoară (born March 25, 1988) is a Romanian basketball player for BCM U Pitești and the Romanian national team.

He participated at the EuroBasket 2017.

References

1988 births
Living people
CSM Oradea (basketball) players
Power forwards (basketball)
Romanian expatriates in Austria
Romanian men's basketball players
Sportspeople from Oradea